Klondike is an unincorporated community in DeKalb County, in the U.S. state of Georgia.

History
The community was named from the Klondike Gold Rush.

References

Unincorporated communities in DeKalb County, Georgia